Half Smiles of the Decomposed is the fifteenth album by Dayton, Ohio rock group Guided by Voices. It was the final album by the band before their 2010 reformation.

Track listing
All songs written by Robert Pollard.
"Everybody Thinks I'm a Raincloud (When I'm Not Looking)" – 3:20
"Sleep Over Jack" – 3:04
"Girls of Wild Strawberries" – 2:30
"Gonna Never Have to Die" – 2:17
"Window of My World" – 2:58
"The Closets of Henry" – 2:31
"Tour Guide at the Winston Churchill Memorial" – 3:02
"Asia Minor" – 2:23
"Sons of Apollo" – 4:04
"Sing for Your Meat" – 4:03
"Asphyxiated Circle" – 2:50
"A Second Spurt of Growth" – 2:46
"(S)Mothering and Coaching" – 3:21
"Huffman Prairie Flying Field" – 3:14

Personnel 
The credits do not give specific instruments played by each individual, but rather list every performer who appeared on the release in any capacity.

GBV 

 Robert Pollard - Vocals, composer
 Chris Slusarenko - Performer
 Doug Gillard - Performer
 Kevin March - Performer
 Nate Farley - Performer

Other/production 

 Todd Tobias - Production, engineer, mixing, ambience

References

2004 albums
Guided by Voices albums
Matador Records albums